A flatmate is a person who shares a flat.

Flatmate or flatmates may also refer to:

Flatmate (film), development title for the film Sleep Tight
Flatmates (British TV series), 2019 comedy-drama series
Flatmates (New Zealand TV series), 1997 reality show
The Flatmates, British indie pop band